Sara Pérez may refer to:

 Sara Pérez (triathlete) (born 1988), Spanish triathlete and road cyclist
 Sara Pérez (diver) (born 1996), diver from Colombia
 Sara Rojo Pérez (born 1973), painter and artist
 Sara Pérez (volleyball)